Sanny Lindström (born December 24, 1979) is a Swedish former professional ice hockey defenceman who played in the Swedish Hockey League.

Playing career
Lindström was drafted in the fourth round, 112th overall in the 1999 NHL Entry Draft by the Colorado Avalanche. Prior to his selection, Lindström was already playing professionally in the Swedish Division.1 with original club Huddinge IK.

Sanny left for North American the following season, although without a contract from the Avalanche, signed with AHL affiliate, the Hershey Bears. Unable to sustain a role in the AHL, Lindström played in lower leagues with the Baton Rouge Kingfish and the Quad City Mallards.

Lindström returned to Sweden after three seasons and signed with Timrå IK of the Elitserien in 2002. Establishing himself as a physical defensive defender, he was named captain in 2005 and played in six seasons in total with Timrå before signing a one-year contract with Swiss club Rapperswil-Jona Lakers in 2008.

In the 2008-09 season, Lindström responded positively to his new surroundings as he led the Lakers defense in scoring with 17 points in 41 games. On April 14, 2009, he returned to the Elitserien on a two-year contract to captain Färjestads BK.

During the early stages of the 2012–13 season, Lindström's fourth with Färjestads, he received a career ending concussion against Jokerit on October 28, 2012. He announced his retirement from professional hockey after still suffering symptoms 10 months after the injury on August 17, 2013.

Career statistics

Regular season and playoffs

International

References

External links

1979 births
Baton Rouge Kingfish players
Colorado Avalanche draft picks
Färjestad BK players
Hershey Bears players
Huddinge IK players
Living people
Quad City Mallards (UHL) players
SC Rapperswil-Jona Lakers players
Swedish ice hockey defencemen
Swedish expatriate sportspeople in Switzerland
Swedish expatriate ice hockey players in the United States
Timrå IK players
Ice hockey people from Stockholm